Carlos Alberto Sánchez (born in Girardot, Colombia, 1974), better known in the entertainment world as Charlie Zaa, is a Colombian singer. Zaa is the son of singer Luis Humberto Sánchez.

Early and personal life
Zaa was a singer in two Colombian salsa orchestras: "Grupo Niche" and "Guayacán". When he launched his career as a solo artist, he decided to switch to the bolero rhythm. This career decision was made in the mid 90s.

On July 23, 2004, Zaa suffered a severe abdominal pain as he was about to begin a concert in Ponce, Puerto Rico. He couldn't perform that day, having to be taken to a local hospital. Zaa was then flown to Miami, Florida, where he remained hospitalized until he was diagnosed with a kidney condition. Soon after, his personal doctor corrected the problem in a surgery performed in his native Colombia.

Zaa's daughter Lauren Mia Sanchez was a survivor of the 2018 Stoneman Douglas High School shooting in which 17 people lost their lives, including one of her teachers.

Music career
Charlie Zaa has recorded over 10 albums since launching his career as a solo artist. His record Sentimientos, in which he sings some past hit songs, sold over three million copies throughout Latin America and the United States. His albums Sentimientos and Un Segundo Sentimiento led to him winning the 1998 Artist of the Year award at the Billboard Latin Music Awards. For his fourth album, Zaa returned to the Sonolux studios in Bogotá, where he made his first album Sentimiento, and to his original producer, Milton Salcedo, and recorded old romantic standards, boleros and waltzes, in an attempt to replicate the success of Sentimiento. Zaa's album De Un Solo Sentimiento was nominated for a Latin Grammy Award in 2002. In 2011, Zaa's album De Bohemia reached the top of the Billboard Latin Albums chart. Some of Charlie Zaa's music was inspired by  notable Ecuadorian singer and recording artistJulio Jaramillo.

Discography
 Sentimientos (1996)
 Un Segundo Sentimiento (1998)
 Ciego de Amor (2000)
 De Un Solo Sentimiento (2001)
 Puro Sentimiento (2004)
 De Bohemia (2011)
 Mi Mejor Regalo (2015)
 Celebración (2017)

References

1974 births
Living people
21st-century Colombian male singers
Converts to Christianity
Colombian Christians
Sony Music Latin artists
Bolero singers
People from Cundinamarca Department
20th-century Colombian male singers